My Parents Are Aliens is a British children's television sitcom airing from 1999 until 2006. The full cast for My Parents Are Aliens is tabled below including both the character and the actor/actress who played the role in each season.

Characters

My Parents Are Aliens